
Gmina Michów is a rural gmina (administrative district) in Lubartów County, Lublin Voivodeship, in eastern Poland.

Villages
Gmina Michów contains the villages and settlements of Aleksandrówka, Anielówka, Budki, Chudowola, Elżbietów, Gawłówka, Giżyce, Gołąb, Gołąb-Kolonia, Katarzyn, Kolonia Giżyce, Krupy, Kruszyna, Lipniak, Mejznerzyn, Meszno, Miastkówek, Michów, Młyniska, Natalin, Ostrów, Podlodówek, Rawa, Rudno, Rudzienko, Rudzienko-Kolonia, Trzciniec, Węgielce, Wólka Michowska, Wypnicha and Zofianówka.

Neighbouring gminas
Gmina Michów is bordered by the gminas of Abramów, Baranów, Firlej, Jeziorzany, Kamionka and Kock.

References

Polish official population figures 2006

Michow
Lubartów County